The New-England Courant (also spelled New England Courant), one of the first American newspapers, was founded in Boston in 1721, by James Franklin. It was a weekly newspaper and the third to appear in Boston. Unlike other newspapers, it offered a more critical account about the British colonial government and other royal figures of authority. The newspaper published critical commentary about smallpox inoculation which fueled the controversy during the smallpox epidemic in Boston. Ultimately it was suppressed in 1726 by British colonial authorities for printing what they considered seditious articles. Franklin took on his brother, Benjamin Franklin, as an apprentice and at one point was compelled to sign over publication of the Courant to him to avert further prosecution. Benjamin submitted anonymous editorials to the Courant, which resulted in James' imprisonment after he began publishing them.This sort of Governmental censorship of early colonial newspapers is what largely fostered the American ideal of Freedom of Speech in the press. The New England Courant is widely noted among historians as being the first newspaper to publish Benjamin's writings.

History

The New-England Courant made its first appearance on Monday, August 7, 1721, printed and published by James Franklin and was the third newspaper established in Boston. James was the elder brother of the renown Benjamin Franklin, and began his printing career in Boston in March 1716 at the age of twenty-five. He owned his own printing press and type brought over from London where he had served as an apprentice. He printed pamphlets for various booksellers, and was the first printer for The Boston Gazette. When Samuel Kneeland and his partner took over  publication of the Gazette James was replaced as its printer. Offended by the loss of that position, and encouraged by a number of respectable friends who wanted to see a newspaper that presented a more critical and candid view than other newspapers, he established and began to print The New-England Courant, and without official review and approval, at his own risk.

Operating without a printing license from provincial government, The New-England Courant became  the first truly independent American newspaper to use literary content, critical and often humorous essays. It debuted at a time when there was much political and social controversy over the cause of poverty in Boston, which was compounded by the smallpox epidemic, its controversy over the proposed inoculation, and the severe censorship on the part of the provincial government and clergy towards individual opinions and conduct.

James announced the birth of the Courant with a scathing attack on Cotton Mather, a major supporter of inoculation, and in its outspoken and candid capacity his newspaper gave the signal for rebellion against such established authority. Not satisfied with voicing simple protest, it assailed the most honored names and the most deeply cherished opinions without reservation. In a public address James criticized The Boston News-Letter for being overly modest and compliant with governmental authority, referring to it as "a dull vehicle of intelligence".

At 4 pence a copy, the New-England Courant was the most expensive newspaper of its time. It consisted of one single sheet printed on both sides, focusing mostly on shipping reports, snippets of information from neighboring towns, and letters from Europe. From the start, Franklin's New England Courant, was more enthusiastic and outspoken in its treatment of Boston's public affairs than the existing newspapers. Its real substance was in letters to the editor from Boston's intellectuals who were highly critical of the British government viz the Massachusetts province. As such it often found itself in the middle of political or social controversy. The New England Courant, however, proved a success, and rescued James's struggling printing business.

Smallpox controversy

In 1721, just before The New-England Courant made its first appearance, HMS Seahorse arrived at Boston harbor from the West Indies carrying many passengers infected with smallpox.  The highly contagious disease quickly spread and within months approximately nine hundred of Boston's ten thousand residents had died. The smallpox epidemic naturally  was a cause for great alarm, while the city's publishing and other intellectual pursuits had declined considerably. A highly questionable method of inoculation was being proposed, but the greater Boston populace feared that this would only serve to accelerate the spread of the disease. Strong differences in opinion over the ethics of inoculation sparked a bitter newspaper and pamphlet war, of which the Courant was playing a major role, beginning with its first issue of August 7.

Reverend Cotton Mather, a prominent and respected Puritan who trained as a physician before becoming a preacher, sent out letters to various doctors in Boston, urging their support for inoculation, but nearly all of them were highly skeptical of the practice. Franklin was bitterly opposed to the prospect and through the New-England Courant he rushed into the fray on the anti-inoculation side. In the Courant he characterized Mather as the "arch-hypocrite of New-England" who had abandoned his religious principles by his support for the smallpox inoculation. At this time the editors of The Boston News-Letter and the Boston Gazette had refused to print any accounts opposing inoculation. Subsequently, one of the reasons Franklin started the Courant was to give Doctor William Douglass and others who opposed inoculation a voice to make their opposition public. Although no actual names were used it was very apparent that the Courant was attacking the Reverend Mather by mocking and mimicking his sermons.

On January 14 a committee of the House ordered James Franklin from further publication of the New-England Courant as they felt that it was being used to mock religion and held the holy scriptures in contempt, while the "faithful Ministers of the Gospel" were being routinely slandered. In response to Franklin's derogatory statements Mather declared that The New-England Courant was "carried on by a Hell-Fire Club, with a Non-Juror at the head of them." Mather openly condemned and denounced the "vile Courant", for "wicked Libel" and for "Wicked Comments" made against him in an address to the general public, which was published in the January 29, 1721 issue of The Boston Gazette. From that point on Franklin and his newspaper were incessantly challenged in this manner for their criticisms about inoculation and the clergy.

Legal trouble
At various times during his six-year term as printer and publisher of the New-England Courant James Franklin found himself at odds and in the middle of controversy with the Massachusetts provincial government and the Clergy. On June 11, 1722, he printed what appeared to be an innocent enough account about the particular affairs of the Massachusetts government when he published that, 

The magisterial Council for their own reasons took this to be an insult, and perhaps a breach of security, resulting in James' incarceration  for a couple of weeks. Meanwhile, Benjamin took over operations of the Courant. However, upon the publication January issue 1723, James got into serious trouble when he published an account, which Benjamin later referred to as an "Essay against Hypocrites”. Against the advice of his father and various friends Franklin, regardless, published the paper's first issue.

In 1718 Franklin's younger brother, Benjamin Franklin, was pressed into service as his apprentice at the age of twelve, while he was printer for The Boston Gazette - three years before he established the Courant. The apprenticeship included a variety of odd jobs, including typesetting issuing pamphlets, linens and silks. Beginning at age sixteen, Benjamin would later write some fifteen controversial editorials under the pen name of Silence Dogood, disguising his hand-writing, and submitted them to the Courant by slipping them under the door of the printing shop. His brother had no knowledge about who had actually written them.  Impressed with the writing, James shared the Dogood letters with his newspaper colleagues who regarded them with equal approval. After his editorials began appearing in the Courant Benjamin was thrilled that his writing was being published for the public to read. When he finally informed his brother that he was the author James became angry. One of the letters was about the virtues of freedom of speech, and contained the following passage: "WITHOUT Freedom of Thought, there can be no such Thing as Wisdom; and no such thing as public Liberty, without Freedom of Speech; which is the right of every man, as far as by it, he does not hurt or control the Right of another."  One such article led to James Franklin's imprisonment from June 12 until July 7, 1722, after he declined to reveal the identity of its author. Benjamin Franklin continued to publish the Courant while James was serving his term in prison. Upon his release Franklin was ordered by the Massachusetts provincial government to cease publishing The New-England Courant, without first submitting its contents for review by the secretary of the Massachusetts province. However, Franklin, regardless, continued publishing the Courant, which went unpunished, and which marked the beginning of the end of restrictive censorship by the government.

Aftermath

Deeply galled over the cause of his brother's imprisonment, Benjamin "unleashed a piercing attack" at colonial authorities after James' release from jail, through another Silence Dogood editorial (essay 9), which was carried by the July 16–23, 1722 issue of Courant, considered the "most biting of his entire career". In the opening passage of the editorial the question was put forward:

Not long after his release from prison, in January 1723, James subsequently held a secret meeting with his brother, now seventeen years old, in his shop. There they decided that the best way to get around the government's prohibitive order was to publish the Courant without James as the official publisher. Beginning on Monday, February 11, 1723, the inscription, "Printed and sold by Benjamin Franklin" appeared in the heading of the Courant. Benjamin conducted its publication more cautiously than did his brother. His first issue contained an editorial which denounced publishing anything " hateful" and "malicious". It declared that from now on the Courant would be "designed purely for the diversion and merriment of the reader" and also to "entertain the town with the most comical and diverting incidents of human life." The editorial also stated that the master of  The New-England Courant  would be the Roman god Janus, who could look in opposite directions at the same time.

Subsequent issues, however, did not live up to declaration put forward in Benjamin's editorial.  Most of the articles consisted of dated dispatches rehashing foreign news and old speeches. Only one of these essays was clearly written by Benjamin which were an essay about the folly of titles of nobility, which was consistent with his lifelong aversion to titles based on heredity and aristocracy. A few weeks passed and James, considered a man of jealous and
tyrannical disposition, returned to the Courant and resumed treating Benjamin as an apprentice, and subjected his teenage brother to beatings, rather than as a fellow writer and brother. Eventually the relationship between James and Benjamin Franklin suffered as the New-England Courant reached the peak of its fame. Benjamin would later recall that this "demanded too much of me", and was now anxious to move out on his own and in 1723, he left for Philadelphia. Benjamin assumed correctly that his brother would not seek legal recourse for breaking his apprenticeship with James, as it would reveal that James had signed over the New-England Courant in his name, undermining the arrangement James had with Benjamin.  The New-England Courant continued to be published under Benjamin's name until the final release of its 255th issue, dated June 25, 1726. The Courant thereafter slowly failed in the face of the constant conflicts with Mathers and Puritanical Boston and wore James down, where he subsequently folded the paper and removed to Rhode Island where he eventually died in 1735.

Legacy
Benjamin Franklin biographer, Walter Isaacson, maintains that the New-England Courant  is remembered in history chiefly because it contained the first words of Benjamin to be published for the general public, which launched Benjamin's printing career. James Franklin came to be known as the strict and jealous master which Benjamin described in his famous autobiography. Isaacson further states that The New-England Courant was America's first independent newspaper that proved to be a bold-anti-establishment journal, the "first open effort to defy the norm", and the first newspaper that promoted the ideal of Freedom of Speech.

The only known remaining copies of The New-England Courant are housed in the library of the Massachusetts Historical Society. They are all bound together in one volume, and are far from being in perfect condition. The April 2, 1722 issue (pictured below) is the only surviving issue of The New-England Courant that published Benjamin Franklin's earliest known writing.

Selected issues

See also
 Early American publishers and printers
 Newspapers of colonial America

Notes

Citations

Bibliography

 

 

  Google link

External links

 Brief history and scanned issues, from the Electric Ben Franklin. 
 The First Newspapers in America

Publications established in 1721
18th century in Boston
Newspapers published in Boston
Defunct newspapers published in Massachusetts
1721 establishments in Massachusetts
Colonial American printers